Kritesville is an unincorporated community in Calhoun County, Illinois, United States. Kritesville is located near the Mississippi River north of Batchtown.

References

Unincorporated communities in Calhoun County, Illinois
Unincorporated communities in Illinois